Orthocomotis albobasalis is a species of moth of the family Tortricidae. It is found in Loja Province, Ecuador.

The wingspan is 26–29 mm. The ground colour of the forewings is white in the form of a large terminal blotch. Other parts of the interfascia are greyish with brownish spots and green scaling. The markings are brown. The hindwings are whitish up to the middle, tinged grey cream postmedially.

Etymology
The species name refers to the whitish base of the hindwings and is derived from Latin albus (meaning white) and basalis (meaning basal).

References

Moths described in 2007
Orthocomotis